Daniel John McLellan (August 6, 1928 – October 27, 1979) was a Canadian professional hockey player and coach in the National Hockey League. He was a member of teams that won the Memorial Cup, the Allan Cup and the world championships.

Playing career
Born in South Porcupine, Ontario (now part of Timmins), McLellan was signed by the Toronto Maple Leafs and brought to Toronto to play for the St. Michael's Buzzers (1945–46) and then the St. Michael's Majors, playing on the team that won the Memorial Cup in 1947. As a senior, McLellan played three seasons with the Toronto Marlboros, winning the Allan Cup in 1950. Both of McLellan's cup victories came under coach Joe Primeau.

McLellan turned professional in 1950, and would play most of the next four seasons with the Pittsburgh Hornets, the Maple Leafs' American Hockey League affiliate. In 1950–51, he also played for the Tulsa Oilers of the United States Hockey League. McLellan was called up to the Maple Leafs for two games in 1951–52, and they would be his only games as a player in the NHL.

He was traded by the Leafs to the AHL Cleveland Barons in September 1954, and played there for four years. In May 1958, the Barons told him he could make his own deal to join another team. For the 1958–59 season, McLellan was reinstated as an amateur and played for the Belleville McFarlands. The team represented Canada at the 1959 Ice Hockey World Championships, winning gold.

McLellan played in other minor professional leagues through the rest of his career, playing for the Milwaukee Falcons of the International Hockey League in 1959–60 and the Timmins Flyers of the Northern Ontario Hockey League in 1960–61. In 1962, he joined the Nashville Dixie Flyers of the Eastern Hockey League and played there for two seasons, before retiring as a player and becoming coach of the Nashville team.

Coaching career
After two years coaching in Nashville–winning the league championship both seasons—McLellan rejoined the Maple Leafs organization in 1967 as the head coach of their top minor league affiliate, the Tulsa Oilers of the Central Hockey League. He spent two years in Tulsa and was then brought back to the NHL in 1969 to succeed the fired Punch Imlach as head coach of the Toronto Maple Leafs. McLellan was coach of the Leafs for four seasons—missing 15 games in 1971–72 due to a duodenal ulcer. He was voted NHL coach of the year in 1971. McLellan resigned as coach in 1973 to become the Leafs' assistant general manager.

In 1977, Imlach offered him the head coaching job with the Buffalo Sabres, but McLellan declined. The two were briefly reunited in Toronto when Imlach rejoined the Maple Leafs in 1979. A few months later, the 51-year-old McLellan died from an apparent heart attack after raking leaves at his home in Agincourt, Toronto.

Career statistics

Regular season and playoffs

International

Coaching record

References

1928 births
1979 deaths
Canadian ice hockey coaches
Canadian people of Ulster-Scottish descent
Cleveland Barons (1937–1973) players
Ice hockey people from Ontario
Milwaukee Falcons players
Nashville Dixie Flyers players
Ontario Hockey Association Senior A League (1890–1979) players
Pittsburgh Hornets players
St. Michael's Buzzers players
Sportspeople from Timmins
Toronto Maple Leafs coaches
Toronto Maple Leafs players
Toronto Marlboros players
Toronto St. Michael's Majors players
Tulsa Oilers (USHL) players